John Webb Dillion (6 February 1877 – 20 December 1949) was an English actor. He appeared in more than 80 films between 1911 and 1947. He was born in London and died in Hollywood, California, USA. He was married to Catherine Urlau.

Selected filmography

 The Woman's Law (1916)
 Romeo and Juliet (1916)
 The Primitive Call (1917)
 The Darling of Paris (1917)
 The Tiger Woman (1917)
 Heart and Soul (1917)
 The House of Hate (1918)
 Joan of Plattsburg (1918)
 A Scream in the Night (1919)
 Trailed by Three (1920)
 The Law of the Yukon (1920)
 The Inner Chamber (1921)
Jane Eyre (1921)
 Speed (1922)
 The Mohican's Daughter (1922)
 The Rapids (1922)
 Married People (1922)
 Tiger Thompson (1924)
 The Devil's Cargo (1925)
 The Air Mail (1925)
 The Great Jewel Robbery (1925)
 The Seventh Bandit (1926)
 Snowed In (1926)
 The House Without a Key (1926)
 The Trail of the Tiger (1927)
 The Tiger's Shadow (1928)
 Dry Martini (1928)
 The Black Book (1929)
 The Cisco Kid (1931)
 Sally of the Subway (1932)

References

External links

1877 births
1949 deaths
English male film actors
English male silent film actors
Male actors from London
British emigrants to the United States
20th-century English male actors